, is a Japanese singer and actor. Under the stage name Showta (stylized as "SHOWTA."), he debuted as a singer with the song "Negaiboshi" in 2006 and released his first studio album, Eve, in 2008. In 2009, he left his agency and briefly released music independently under the pseudonym .

After making his acting debut as Saki Hanajima in the Fruits Basket musical in 2009, Aoi has been involved in multiple musical theatre productions, including Sakuya Shiomi in Persona 3: The Weird Masquerade. In 2011, he began voice acting and gained media attention after voicing Ai Mikaze from Uta no Prince-sama. Since then, he has been recognized for roles such as Hideaki Tojo from Ace of Diamond, Monet Tsukushi in the Magic-kyun! Renaissance series, Rui Minazuki from the Tsukiuta series, Louis Kisaragi from King of Prism series, and Licht von Glanzreich from The Royal Tutor.

In 2013, Aoi relaunched his singing career under his new stage name with the extended play Blue Bird, followed by the release of "Virginal" in 2014. In 2015, he released his first studio album, Unlimited. Since the relaunch of his music career, his music is produced by Elements Garden.

Throughout his career, Aoi has been given titles such as "Archangel" and was praised for his "angelic" singing voice. He is known for his soft, high-pitched voice and androgynous appearance, allowing him to play female parts as well.

Early life 
Aoi was born in Fukui Prefecture, Japan. He has one older sister. From elementary to high school, he played tennis and won many trophies. As a child, he watched a lot of anime and played video games, citing his interest in voice acting through Akira Ishida's portrayal of Fish Eye from Sailor Moon SuperS. In school, he was bullied for his high-pitched, feminine voice. He credits his friends from junior high school for helping him regain his confidence after they complimented his performance of "So Into You" by Koda Kumi during a karaoke outing. In 2004, he competed in the Yamaha Teens' Music Festival under the name "Noboru Yanagawa" and won the Grand Prix for the Tokai, Ibaraki region. Initially, when he first auditioned, he had mistakenly believed it was an amateur karaoke competition. He was a finalist at the national competition, along with Ataru Nakamura, where he performed "1000 no Kotoba" by Koda Kumi.

Career

2006-2010: Musical debut, Eve, and indies activities
Aoi debuted under the name Showta with the single "Negaiboshi" on July 26, 2006 under King Records, which charted at #119 on the Oricon Weekly Singles Chart. On November 22, 2006, he released his second single, "Trans-winter (Fuyu no Mukōgawa)", which served as the theme song to the live-action television adaptation of the manga Damens Walker. His third single, "Hito Shizuku", a mid-tempo ballad, was released on April 4, 2007. His fourth single, "Kimi ni, Kaze ga Fukimasu You ni" was released on July 27, 2007 as the ending theme song to Ichiteru. For his fifth single, he released a cover of Yoshie Kashiwabara's 1983  song "Haru na no ni" on January 23, 2008.

Aoi released his first studio album, Eve, on March 5, 2008, which charted at #115 on the Oricon Weekly Albums Chart. His sixth single, "Hikaru no Gen-chan", was released on April 23, 2008 for NHK's Minna no Uta segments during the months of April and May. In 2009, Aoi contributed the song "Ekubo" to the movie soundtrack of Kanna-san Daiseiko Desu! the Movie, which was released as a promotional digital single. He made his first acting appearance as Saki Hanajima in the Fruits Basket stage play adaptation.

In 2010, Aoi left King Records, citing his desire to become a voice actor and theme song performer. He began releasing music and performing independently under the name Noboru Ryugaki. He was a featured artist in the song "Oji-sama to Cheek" on Kenzo Saeki and Boogie the Mach Motors' collaboration album, 21-Seiki-san sings Harlmens. During this time, he also performed in independent musical theatre and stage productions.

2011-2016: Voice acting debut and stage activities 
Aoi signed onto S Inc. in 2011 for voice acting and debuted under the name Shouta Aoi, making his first appearance as Kanshiki in the game Black Robinia. He performed "Ai no Sasameki Goto" as the first song released under his new stage name, which served as the theme song to the drama CD series Sangokushi Lovers. In October, he voiced Ryunosuke Matsushita in the anime Kimi to Boku and also performed the songs "Sora", "Tomorrow" and "Over" for the show's soundtrack.

In 2012, Aoi was cast as Ai Mikaze in the Uta no Prince-sama media franchise, where he performed and sang several songs for the character in the game and anime soundtracks. After gaining recognition from the success of his role, Aoi released his first extended play, Blue Bird, on January 13, 2013, which contained theme songs he performed for Broccoli drama CDs. On January 15, 2014, Aoi released his first single, "Virginal", under his stage name, as the ending theme song to Break Out, which was then followed by his first concert, Shouta Aoi 1st Live: Virginal. On August 6, 2014, he released his second single, "True Hearts." Alongside of singing and voice acting, Aoi continued participating in stage productions, including playing Sakuya Shiomi in the Persona 3: The Weird Masquerade musicals.

In late 2014, Aoi was cast as Ayumu Tamari in the OVA This Boy Suffers From Crystallization, his first leading role in animation. He also provided the theme song, "Glitter Wish", which was later released as the B-side to his third single, "Himitsu no Kuchizuke", on December 3, 2014. In 2015, he released his first studio album, Unlimited, which charted at #7 on the Oricon Weekly Albums Chart. Aoi's fourth single, "Murasaki", was released on September 2, 2015, serving as the theme song to the stage musical Prince Kaguya, which he also starred in as the title character. On February 3, 2016, he released the single "Zessei Stargate" as the opening theme song to Phantasy Star Online 2: The Animation, in which he also voiced the character Itsuki Tachibana.

2016-present: Label change
Aoi returned to King Records in 2016. During that year, both B-green and King Records released compilation albums of his previous works, S and Showta Best. After changing labels, Aoi released his sixth single, "Innocent", as the opening theme song to First Love Monster on July 27, 2016, in which he also played Renren. His seventh single, "DDD", was released October 19 as the theme song to Future Card Buddyfight DDD, a series in which he also played recurring character Gaito Gurenzo. On January 25, 2017, Aoi released the song "Flower", which was the ending theme song for the variety show King's Brunch for the month of January. On October 11, 2017, he released his second studio album, Zero, which sold 11,361 copies within its first week.

On May 9, 2018, Aoi released the song "Eclipse" as the opening theme song to Devils' Line, in which he also appeared in as Kenichi Yoshii. In 2019, he provided the narration to Dimension High School and later appeared in the show as Shiro Oide, his first role in live-action television. On April 10, 2019, Aoi released his ninth single, "Tone", as the opening theme song to Kono Oto Tomare! Sounds of Life, in which he was also cast as Mio Kanzaki. On May 3, 2019, a set of 24 voiced stickers featuring Aoi for the messaging application Line was released, based on his radio show Shouta Aoi: Hungry Night. In September 2019, Aoi appeared in the live-action television drama Real Fake as Akane.

On October 10, 2022, Aoi released "Psycho:Logy" as a digital single, which was used as the opening theme of the second season of Pop Team Epic. On October 15, 2022, Aoi announced that he has left his management company S and will be working freelance.

Public image

Since the beginning of his career, Aoi has been recognized for his soft, high-pitched voice and has been given nicknames such as "archangel" and "angelic singing voice." He is also branded as being a "genderless singer" due to his androgynous voice and appearance, which allowed him to play female roles. In a survey conducted by Anime! Anime!, 50% women and 50% men in the questionnaire ranked him as #2 as the voice actor with the most "angelic" voice. Aoi himself became an Internet meme following his appearance in Pop Team Epic, in which the studio responded by releasing exclusive merchandise of him. In 2018, Aoi was the second most-followed voice actor on Twitter in Japan.

Other ventures

Endorsements
Aoi has appeared in commercials for CyberStep Toreba 2D. In 2016, Aoi appeared and sang in the commercial for Lotte's Lady Borden ice cream along with Yuki Kaji and Kenshō Ono.

Collaborations

In 2017, Denon produced a collaboration headphone set with Aoi, and he also starred in their commercial. In April 2018, Sanrio released a fashion collaboration line with Aoi and Little Twin Stars, featuring a character based on himself named "Shoutan" and Tamutamu, a character Aoi personally designed. The character line ranked #5 in the 2018 Sanrio Character Ranking in the collaborations category. Sanrio distributed a mini album for the Shoutan character performed by Aoi himself, titled Twinkle Star.

Discography

As Showta

Studio albums
 Eve (2008)

Compilation albums
 Showta Best (2016)

As Shouta Aoi

Studio albums
 Unlimited (2015)
 Zero (2017)

Mini albums
 Blue Bird (2013)

Compilation albums
 S (2016)

Filmography

Theatre

Anime

Films

Video games

Drama CD

{| class="wikitable sortable"
|-
! Year
! Title
! Role
! class="unsortable" | Notes
|-
| 2013–present
|Tsukiuta series
|Rui Minazuki
| 
|-
| 2013
|Sengoku Soine
|Ishida Mitsunari
| 
|-
| 2014
|Ginga Idol Cho Kareshi
|Chizane
| 
|-
| 2014–present
|Happy Sugar Darlin''' series
|Ranran Kurumiya
| 
|-
| 2016
|Fresh Kiss 100%|Ruka
| 
|-
| 2016
|Moso Kareshi|Kuro
| 
|-
| 2017
|Dynamic Chord|Nal
| 
|-
| 2017
|Heiko Sekai to Hakoniwa Heya|Asanaga Shijyo, Osamu Shijyo
| 
|-
| 2017
|Blackish House| Sera
| 
|-
| 2017-18
|Otodoke Kareshi series
|Haruka Hinata
| 
|-
| 2018
|Marginal Lover| Tsubasa
| 
|-
| 2019
| Makai Ōji-sama no Chōzetsu Amayakashi Drama CD| Prince of the Demon World
| 
|-
| 2021
| Magia Circus DramaCD 〜 It's Showtime 〜| Ciel
|
|}

Original video animation (OVA)

Live-action and variety shows

Tours
 Shouta Aoi 1st Live: Virginal (2014)
 Shouta Aoi 2nd Live: Unlimited (2015)
 Shouta Aoi LIVE: 2016 WONDER lab. 〜Bokutachi no (僕たちの) sign〜 (2016)
 Shouta Aoi LIVE: 2017 WONDER lab. 〜prism〜 (2017)
 Shouta Aoi LIVE: 2017 WONDER lab. Ø (2017)
 Shouta Aoi LIVE: 2019 WONDER lab. I (2019)
 Shouta Aoi LIVE: 蒼井翔太 ONLINE LIVE at 日本武道館 うたいびと'' (2021)

References

External links
 Official blog 
  
 
 

1987 births
Living people
Male voice actors from Fukui Prefecture
Actors from Fukui Prefecture
Japanese male musical theatre actors
Japanese male stage actors
Japanese male pop singers
Japanese male video game actors
Japanese male voice actors
Musicians from Fukui Prefecture
21st-century Japanese singers
21st-century Japanese male actors
21st-century Japanese male singers